Owl Hours is the second collaborative studio album by American rapper Awol One and Canadian producer Factor. It was released on Fake Four Inc. in 2009.

Critical reception
Michaelangelo Matos of The A.V. Club gave the album a grade of C−, calling it "an annoying one." Thomas Quinlan of Exclaim! said, "While the mainstream might not be ready for Awol One, Owl Hours is evidence that he's more than ready for them, and getting impatient."

Track listing

References

External links
 

2009 albums
Collaborative albums
Fake Four Inc. albums
Awol One albums
Albums produced by Factor (producer)